Several space objects and features have been named after Hungarian people or things in Hungary. These include planetary features on Mars and Venus, asteroids and exoplanets.

Moon 
 Béla (crater)
 Bolyai (crater)
 Eötvös (crater)
 Fényi (crater)
 Hell (crater)
 Von Békésy (crater)
 Hédervári (crater)
 Izsak (crater)
 Petzval (crater)
 Szilard (crater)
 Von Kármán (lunar crater)
 Weinek (crater)
 Zach (crater)
 Zsigmondy (crater)

Mercury 
 Bartók (crater)
 Jókai (crater)
 Kertész (crater)
 Liszt (crater)
 Munkácsy (crater)
 Petőfi (crater)

Venus 
 Erica crater
 Klafsky crater
 Margit crater
 Orczy crater
 Tünde crater

Mars 
 Von Kármán (Martian crater)
 Bak crater
 Eger crater
 Igal crater
 Kalocsa crater
 Paks crater

Asteroids 
 1546 Izsák

Exoplanets 
 Magor

References

External links 
 https://mtklub.blog.hu/2007/01/19/hires_magyarokrol_elnevezett_kraterek_a_holdon
 https://hirmagazin.sulinet.hu/hu/tudomany/magyarok_a_vilagurben
 https://www.csillagaszat.hu/csilltort/magyar-csillagaszattortenet/magyar-altalanos/magyar-kraterek-a-marson/

Space program of Hungary
Astronomical nomenclature by nation